A currency union (also known as monetary union) is an intergovernmental agreement that involves two or more states sharing the same currency. These states may not necessarily have any further integration (such as an economic and monetary union, which would have, in addition, a customs union and a single market).

There are three types of currency unions:
 Informal – unilateral adoption of a foreign currency.
 Formal – adoption of foreign currency by virtue of bilateral or multilateral agreement with the monetary authority, sometimes supplemented by issue of local currency in currency peg regime.
 Formal with common policy – establishment by multiple countries of a common monetary policy and monetary authority for their common currency.

The theory of the optimal currency area addresses the question of how to determine what geographical regions should share a currency in order to maximize economic efficiency.

Advantages and disadvantages

Implementing a new currency in a country is always a controversial topic because it has both many advantages and disadvantages. New currency has different impacts on businesses and individuals, which creates more points of view on the usefulness of currency unions. As a consequence, governmental institutions often struggle when they try to implement a new currency, for example by entering a currency union.

Advantages
A currency union helps its members strengthen their competitiveness on a global scale and eliminate the exchange rate risk.
Transactions among member states can be processed faster and their costs decrease since fees to banks are lower.
Prices are more transparent and so are easier to compare, which enables fair competition.
The probability of a monetary crisis is lower. The more countries there are in the currency union, the more they are resistant to crisis.

Disadvantages
The member states lose their sovereignty in monetary policy decisions. There is usually an institution (such as a central bank) that takes care of the monetary policymaking in the whole currency union.
The risk of asymmetric "shocks" may occur. The criteria set by the currency union are never perfect, so a group of countries might be substantially worse off while the others are booming.
Implementing a new currency causes high financial costs. Businesses and also single persons have to adapt to the new currency in their country, which includes costs for the businesses to prepare their management, employees, and they also need to inform their clients and process plenty of new data.
Unlimited capital movement may cause moving most resources to the more productive regions at the expense of the less productive regions. The more productive regions tend to attract more capital in goods and services, which might avoid the less productive regions.

Convergence and divergence
Convergence in terms of macroeconomics means that countries have a similar economic behaviour (similar inflation rates and economic growth).
It is easier to form a currency union for countries with more convergence as these countries have the same or at least very similar goals. The European Monetary Union (EMU) is a contemporary model for forming currency unions. Membership in the EMU requires that countries follow a strictly defined set of criteria (the member states are required to have a specific rate of inflation, government deficit, government debt, long-term interest rates and exchange rate). Many other unions have adopted the view that convergence is necessary, so they now follow similar rules to aim the same direction.

Divergence is the exact opposite of convergence. Countries with different goals are very difficult to integrate in a single currency union. Their economic behaviour is completely different, which may lead to disagreements. Divergence is therefore not optimal for forming a currency union.

History
The first currency unions were established in the 19th century. The German Zollverein came into existence in 1834, and by 1866, it included most of the German states. The fragmented states of the German Confederation agreed on common policies to increase trade and political unity.

The Latin Monetary Union, comprising France, Belgium, Italy, Switzerland, and Greece, existed between 1865 and 1927, with coinage made of gold and silver. Coins of each country were legal tender and freely interchangeable across the area. The union's success made other states join informally.

The Scandinavian Monetary Union, comprising Sweden, Denmark, and Norway, existed between 1873 and 1905 and used a currency based on gold. The system was dissolved by Sweden in 1924.

A currency union among the British colonies and protectorates in Southeast Asia, namely the Federation of Malaya, North Borneo, Sarawak, Singapore and Brunei was established in 1952. The Malaya and British Borneo dollar, the common currency for circulation was issued by the Board of Commissioners of Currency, Malaya and British Borneo from 1953 until 1967. Following the cessation of the common currency arrangement, Malaysia (the combination of Federation of Malaya, North Borneo, Sarawak), Singapore and Brunei began issuing their own currencies. Contemporarily, a currency reunion of these countries might still be feasible based on the findings of economic convergence.

List of currency unions

Existing

Note: Every customs and monetary union and economic and monetary union also has a currency union.

 is theoretically in a currency union with four blocs as the South African rand, Botswana pula, British pound and US dollar freely circulate. The US Dollar was, until 2016, official tender.

Additionally, the autonomous and dependent territories, such as some of the EU member state special territories, are sometimes treated as separate customs territory from their mainland state or have varying arrangements of formal or de facto customs union, common market and currency union (or combinations thereof) with the mainland and in regards to third countries through the trade pacts signed by the mainland state.

Currency union in Europe
The European currency union is a part of the Economic and Monetary Union of the European Union (EMU). EMU was formed during the second half of the 20th century after historic agreements, such as Treaty of Paris (1951), Maastricht Treaty (1992). In 2002, the euro, a single European currency, was adopted by 12 member states. Currently, the Eurozone has 20 member states. The other members of the European Union are required to adopt the euro as their currency (except for Denmark, which has been given the right to opt out), but there has not been a specific date set. The main independent institution responsible for stability of the euro is the European Central Bank (ECB). Together with 15 national banks it forms the European System of Central Banks. The Governing Board consists of the Executive Committee of the ECB and the governors of individual national banks, and determines the monetary policy, as well as short-term monetary objectives, key interest rates and the extent of monetary reserves.

Planned

Disbanded

 between  Bahrain and  Abu Dhabi using the Bahraini dinar
 between  Bahrain,  Kuwait,  Oman,  Qatar and the  Trucial States, using the Gulf rupee from 1959 until 1966
 between  Aden,  Bahrain,  Kenya,  Kuwait,  Oman,  Qatar,  British Somaliland,  the Trucial States,  Uganda,  Zanzibar and  British India (later independent  India) using the Indian rupee
 between  Belgium and the  Grand-Duchy of Luxemburg (Belgium-Luxembourg Economic Union) using the Belgian/Luxembourgish franc from 1921 to the Euro
 between  British India and the  Straits Settlements (1837–1867) using the Indian rupee
 between  Czech Republic and  Slovakia (briefly from January 1, 1993 to February 8, 1993) using the Czechoslovak koruna
 between  Ethiopia and  Eritrea using the Ethiopian birr
 between  France,  Monaco, and  Andorra using the French franc
between  Austria-Hungary and  Liechtenstein using the Austro-Hungarian krone
 between the Eastern Caribbean,  Jamaica,  Barbados,  Trinidad and Tobago and  British Guiana using the British West Indies dollar
 between the Eastern Caribbean,   Barbados,  Trinidad and Tobago and  British Guiana using the Eastern Caribbean dollar
 between  Italy,  Vatican City, and  San Marino using the Italian lira
 between  Jamaica and the  Cayman Islands using the Jamaican pound and later Jamaican dollar
 between  Kenya,  Uganda, and  Zanzibar using the East African rupee
 between  Kenya,  Uganda, and  Zanzibar  (and later ) using the East African florin
 between  Kenya,  and  Zanzibar (later merged as  Tanzania),  Uganda,  South Arabia,  British Somaliland and  Italian Somaliland using the East African shilling
 Latin Monetary Union (1865–1927), initially between  France,  Belgium,  Italy and  Switzerland, and later involving  Greece,  Romania,  and other countries.
 between  Liberia and the  United States using the United States dollar
 between  Mauritius and  Seychelles using the Mauritian rupee
 between  Nigeria,  the Gambia,  Sierra Leone,  the Gold Coast and  Liberia using the British West African pound
 between  Prussia and the North German states (1838–1857) using the North German thaler
 between  Russia and the  former Soviet republics (1991–1993) using the Soviet ruble
 between  Qatar and all the emirates of the  United Arab Emirates, except Abu Dhabi using the Qatari and Dubai riyal
 between  Saudi Arabia and  Qatar using the Saudi riyal
 between  Western Samoa and  New Zealand using the New Zealand pound
 Scandinavian Monetary Union (1870s until 1924), between  Denmark,  Norway and  Sweden
 between the  Solomon Islands,  Papua New Guinea and  Australia using the Australian dollar
between  Australia,  Papua,  New Guinea,  Nauru,  the Solomon Islands, and  the Gilbert and Ellice Islands using the Australian pound
 between  Bavaria,  Baden,  Württemberg,  Frankfurt, and  Hohenzollern using the South German guilder
 between  Spain and  Andorra using the Spanish peseta
 between  Trinidad and Tobago and  Grenada using the Trinidad and Tobago dollar
 between  Brunei,  Malaysia, and  Singapore (1953–1967) using the Malaya and British Borneo dollar
 between  Cambodia,  Laos,  Guangzhouwan,   Annam,  Tonkin, and  Cochinchina (later  Vietnam) between 1885 and 1952 using the French Indochinese piastre
 between  Egypt,  Anglo-Egyptian Sudan, and  Mandatory Palestine (until 1926) using the Egyptian pound  
 between  West Germany and  East Germany between 1 July 1990 and 3 October 1990, as part of a temporary, so-called "Monetary, Economic and Social Union" prior to German reunification.
 between what ultimately became the  Republic of Ireland and the  United Kingdom, between 1928 and 1979. The Irish Pound was held at exactly the same value as Sterling for this period, although it was not accepted for payments in the UK.
 between the  Empire of Japan and the  Korean Empire during the latter's forced protectorate (1905-1910) and occupation (1910-1945) by Japan using the Japanese yen and Korean yen.

Never materialized
 proposed Pan-American monetary union – abandoned in the form proposed by Argentina
 proposed monetary union between the  United Kingdom and  Norway using the pound sterling during the late 1940s and early 1950s
 proposed gold-backed, pan-African monetary union put forward by Muammar Gaddafi prior to his death

See also

 List of pegged currencies

 North American Currency Union (Amero)

References

Further reading
 Acocella, N. and Di Bartolomeo, G. and Tirelli, P. [2007], ‘Monetary conservatism and fiscal coordination in a monetary union’, in: ‘Economics Letters’, 94(1): 56–63.

External links

West Africa opts for currency union
Economist- Antipodean currencies (Australia and New Zealand)
Reasons for the collapse of the Rouble Zone
OECD Development Centre – the Rand Zone

Union
 
International macroeconomics
Proposed currencies
Economic integration